Joseph Nekl (28 May 1953 – 29 March 2021) was a Czech politician who served as a member of the Chamber of Deputies of the Czech Republic from 2010 till 2017.

He died on 29 March 2021, at the age of 68, from COVID-19.

References

1953 births
2021 deaths
Czech politicians
Deaths from the COVID-19 pandemic in the Czech Republic
Communist Party of Czechoslovakia politicians
Members of the Chamber of Deputies of the Czech Republic (2010–2013)
Members of the Chamber of Deputies of the Czech Republic (2013–2017)
Politicians from Prostějov